Sucatolba Creek is a stream in the U.S. state of Mississippi.

Sucatolba is a name derived from a Native American language and purported to mean "creek where opossums are killed".

References

Rivers of Mississippi
Rivers of Lauderdale County, Mississippi
Mississippi placenames of Native American origin